Gudalur is a Municipality in Coimbatore district in the Indian state of Tamil Nadu.

Demographics
 India census, Gudalur had a population of 22,321. Males constitute 51% of the population and females constitute 49%. Gudalur has an average literacy rate of 74%, higher than the national average of 59.5%: male literacy is 80%, and female literacy is 67%. In Gudalur, 10% of the population is under 6 years of age.

References

Cities and towns in Coimbatore district